The 1993 Detroit Drive season was the sixth season for the Drive, and the last for the franchise in Detroit, Michigan. They finished 11–1 and were defeated in ArenaBowl VII.

Regular season

Schedule

Standings

z – clinched homefield advantage

y – clinched division title

x – clinched playoff spot

Playoffs

Roster

Awards

1993 Arena Football League season
1993 in sports in Michigan
Massachusetts Marauders